PortConMaine is an annual anime and gaming convention held in the summer in Portland and South Portland, Maine.  Founded by Julie York, it has been held every year since 2002 and hosts many anime and gaming events such as anime screenings, an anime music video contest, a masquerade, guest panels, workshops, game tournaments, a dealers' room, an auction, and PortConMaine's signature "Extreme Geek" event.  In 2008, the convention expanded from three days to four with the first day, Thursday, only open to pre-registered attendees. As of 2016, Thursday became open to everyone.

History 
PortConMaine 2020 was cancelled due to the COVID-19 pandemic.

Event History

See also
 List of anime conventions

References

External links
 PortConMaine's web site
 Interview with PortConMaine's founder and chair

Anime conventions in the United States
Gaming conventions
Multigenre conventions
Recurring events established in 2002
Maine culture
South Portland, Maine
Conventions in Maine